The men's 10 metre air pistol competition at the 2000 Summer Olympics was held on 16 September, the day after the opening ceremony. Franck Dumoulin and Wang Yifu both reached 590 points in the qualification round of 60 shots, raising the Olympic record by three points. Although both shooters performed considerably worse in the final, their seven-point gap to the bronze medal was quite safe. Dumoulin outperformed Wang by two points, setting a new final Olympic record.

Records
Prior to this competition, the existing world and Olympic records were as follows.

Qualification round

DQ Disqualified – OR Olympic record – Q Qualified for final

Final

OR Olympic record

References

Sources

Shooting at the 2000 Summer Olympics
Men's events at the 2000 Summer Olympics